Taxa is a Danish television drama in 56 episodes, written by Stig Thorsboe and produced by Rumle Hammerich for the Danish Broadcasting Corporation.

The series started on 14 September 1997 on DR1. It was broadcast during the period 1997-1999 for a total of five seasons. Taxa was also screened in Sweden on SVT1.

Plot
The series revolves around a small taxi central, CrownTaxi, in Copenhagen. CrownTaxi has its ups and downs and in the course of the series, following the various drivers, radio operator Lizzie and boss Verner Boye-Larsen. They all have their problems both with clients and family life and constantly threaten the show's villain Hermann from the competing taxi firm, City Car, who wants to take over CrownTaxi.

Cast

References

External links

DR television dramas
Danish drama television series
1997 Danish television series debuts
1990s Danish television series
Danish-language television shows